Iulia Helbet (born 31 May 1988) is a Moldovan tennis player.

Helbet has won two doubles titles on the ITF Women's Circuit. On 13 September 2010, she reached her best singles ranking of world No. 1085. On 27 July 2015, she peaked at No. 590 in the doubles rankings.

Playing for Moldova at the Fed Cup, Helbet has a 16–23 win–loss record.

ITF finals

Doubles: 5 (2–3)

References

External links
 
 
 

1988 births
Living people
Sportspeople from Chișinău
Moldovan female tennis players